Venus Williams was the defending champion, but did not compete this year.

Justine Henin-Hardenne won the title by defeating Kim Clijsters 3–6, 6–2, 6–3 in the final.

Seeds
All seeds received a bye into the second round.

Draw

Finals

Top half

Section 1

Section 2

Bottom half

Section 3

Section 4

References

External links
 Official results archive (ITF)
 Official results archive (WTA)

Acura Classic - Singles
Southern California Open